The Fidelity Trust building (also known as the People's United Bank Building') is an historic office building in Monument Square, Portland, Maine. When the 10-story structure was completed in 1910, it became Maine's first skyscraper.  Standing at 135 feet tall, it was designed by Boston architect George Henri Desmond. Designed in the Beaux-Arts style, the Fidelity Trust Building changed Portland's skyline. The building opened to great fanfare. It is listed as an historic Portland Landmark.

As of 2019, the Fidelity Building was Maine's 11th tallest building and the state's 4th largest office building. It is located adjacent to the Time and Temperature Building. It is notable for the ornate facade that covers the side and in particular the top of the structure. The building has commanding easterly views of downtown Portland and Casco Bay. It's westerly views show Back Cove and out to the White Mountains and Mount Washington in New Hampshire.

Through time it has been known as the Maine Bank and Trust Building and presently (due to its tenant and large sign at the top) the People's United Bank Building. Other tenants include; New England Cablevision, Dirigo Financial Group, and Nexrep.

References

Office buildings completed in 1910
Office buildings in Portland, Maine
Skyscraper office buildings in Maine
Beaux-Arts architecture in Maine